Tony Bennett is an American educator and former government official. A member of the Republican Party, Bennett was elected Indiana Superintendent of Public Instruction in 2008. He lost reelection to Democrat Glenda Ritz in the 2012 election.

Bennett was later appointed Florida Commissioner of Education in 2012, a position he held until 2013.

Education and career
Bennett received his Doctor of Education and Indiana Superintendent's License from Spalding University in 2005; his Certification in Secondary Administration and Supervision from Indiana University Southeast in 1994; his Master of Science in Secondary Education from Indiana University Southeast in 1988; and his Bachelor of Science in Secondary Education from Indiana University Southeast in 1984.
Bennett served as a teacher, coach and administrator.
2001–2007: New Albany, Indiana – Floyd County Consolidated Schools – assistant superintendent for administration and operations
Greater Clark County Schools - superintendent
1999–2001: NAFCCS – principal of Charles Allen Prosser School of Technology
1997–1999: Scott County School District 2 – principal of Scottsburg High School
1993–1997: SCSD2 – assistant principal of SHS/ basketball coach
1992–1993: SCSD2 – assistant to the superintendent/ basketball coach
1991–1992: SCSD2 – biology teacher/basketball coach
1990–1991: Mohawk Local Schools (Sycamore, Ohio) – biology teacher/basketball coach
1983–1990: Providence High School – biology/science teacher (basketball coach 1987–1990)

In 2010, the Indiana Chamber of Commerce named him Government Leader of the Year and, in 2011, The Fordham Institute named him Education Reform Idol.

In 2016, Bennett was caucused by the Clark County, Indiana Republican Party to serve on the Clark County, Indiana County Council. The next day, he was unable to take office because he did not meet the residency requirement. However, the individual that was caucused on to the Council resigned months late, Bennett was re-appointed to the position. Following the election of his successor in 2018, Bennett was appointed to fill a different vacancy on the Council that occurred when Councilman Terry Conway was elected as Clark County Recorder.

State superintendent
Bennett was narrowly elected Indiana State Superintendent in 2008, succeeding retiring four-term incumbent Suellen Reed. He was defeated for re-election in an upset in his bid for a second term. He made education reform a key platform of his tenure.

During Bennett's term, student achievement improved on several key academic indicators. Scores on the state's ISTEP+ exam, Advanced Placement pass percentages and graduate rates reached new highs.

Some criticized Bennett and his wife in 2011 because of her involvement with a charter school oversight program at Marian University. The state awarded a contract to Marian to establish a "Turnaround Leadership Academy" to train transformational school leaders. Officials noted the contract was awarded through a competitive request for proposals process.

Despite receiving nearly hundred thousand dollars in out-of-state campaign money, Bennett ended up losing the 2012 superintendent race to Glenda Ritz.

Some controversy arose after the election because the current president of Purdue University, Mitch Daniels, claimed that teachers used illegal tactics to defeat Bennett.

Controversy 
In November 2018, it was reported that Bennett, who directed policies in 2011 that eventually led to a state takeover of the Gary Community School Corporation in 2017, has an ownership stake in the company selected by the GOP-controlled legislature to manage the takeover with a potential to earn $11.4 million. After discovering the conflict of interest in Bennett's ownership in the management company, state and local lawmakers immediately called for a repudiation of the state's contract with his company.

Allegations of wire fraud
Bennett was investigated for misuse of public resources in his 2012 election, which he lost to Glenda Ritz. In July 2014, the State Ethics Commission accepted Bennett's offer to settle the ethics charges by paying a $5,000 fine. Publicly, the commission admonished Bennett for minor ethics violations, but internal documents obtained from the inspector general's office listed more than 100 potential violations of federal wire fraud law by Bennett or his employees. In May 2015, Marion County prosecutors had reviewed the inspector general's internal documents, and declined to pursue charges against Bennett.

Grade manipulation and resignation
In the fall of 2012, Bennett, as Indiana superintendent of schools, changed the "A–F" school rating system so that Christel House Academy, a charter school run by a major Republican donor which had donated $2.8 million to Republicans including $130,000 to Bennett himself, would receive a top A rating. Emails suggested a focus on just the one school. Bennett's email quoted him as saying, "We have NO chance of advancing accountability during the session with this problem in front of us." Subsequent emails showed his staff working to get the charter school up to an A rating. Bennett defended the rating change, saying the prior rating system disadvantaged Christel House because the school instructed students from kindergarten through 10th grade. Bennett said the same rating changes applied to other schools spanning nontraditional grade ranges.

On December 12, 2012, the Florida Board of Education unanimously selected Bennett as the state's new education commissioner.

On August 1, 2013, Bennett announced his resignation due to the scandal surrounding Christel House Academy, citing if he stayed on as commissioner it would "be a distraction to the children of Florida."

Personal
Bennett was born in Clark County, Indiana, is once divorced, is currently married to Tina and lives in Jeffersonville, Indiana. He has four children, including a set of triplets, and three grandchildren.

References

External links
Facebook

Date of birth unknown
Year of birth missing (living people)
Living people
Educators from Indiana
Florida Commissioners of Education
Florida Republicans
Indiana Republicans
Indiana University Southeast alumni
Marian University (Indiana) people
People from Clark County, Indiana
People from Tallahassee, Florida
Spalding University alumni
Superintendents of Public Instruction of Indiana